Rhododendron recurvoides is a rhododendron species native to northeastern Upper Myanmar, where it grows at altitudes of about . The flowers are white flushed with pink, and spotted crimson.

References
 Rhododendron Soc. Notes 3(5): 284 1929-1931 publ. 1932.
 Encyclopedia of Life
 American Rhododendron Society

recurvoides